An executorial trustee is someone who is appointed to be an executor (the person who carries out the directions set forth in a will) and also be a trustee of an estate after the executors duties have been completed.

The role of trustee must be taken at a different time than that of executor, as the position of trustee precludes administration in trust law.

Especially when dealing with large and lucrative estates this position generally does not exist in many cases so as not to create a conflict of interest. The remedy is usually to have an executor act in an arbitrary fashion and have no financial interest in how the estate will be divided up. This can be problematic, given that in some countries, such as the United States, an executor is automatically entitled to compensation for his or her services.

See also: trust law, inheritance, executor, trustee,
wiktionary definition

References

Legal professions